Antonín Kříž may refer to:

 Antonín Kříž (biathlete) (born 1953), Czech Olympic biathlete
 Antonín Kříž (cyclist) (born 1943), Czech Olympic cyclist